Our Wives is a 1913 comedy short silent film, written by Anthony E. Wills, and directed by James Lackaye.

Cast
 Harry T. Morey ... 	Rosweel Chandler
 Louise Beaudet ... 	Mrs. Rosweel Chandler
 Lillian Walker ... 	Belle
 Wally Van ... 	Walter Blair
 Ada Gifford ... 	Hilda Deveaux
 Charles Brown ... 	Oscar Simbel
 Frank O'Neil ... 	Mallory
 Niles Welch	 ... 	Stanton
 Ethel Lloyd ... 	Julia

External links

1913 films
American black-and-white films
American silent short films
1913 comedy films
Vitagraph Studios short films
1913 short films
Silent American comedy films
American comedy short films
1910s American films